Vinicio Edwards Espinal Marte (born 14 November 1982 in Santo Domingo) is a Dominican former football player who currently works as the head coach of Eccellenza amateurs Ospitaletto. A former Serie A player, he is the twin brother of José Espinal and also holds Italian nationality.

Club career
Edwards emigrated to Italy in 1991, where he played with Serie A team Atalanta. He moved to Calcio Portogruaro Summaga in Serie C1 during January 2009.

International career
Espinal is a holding midfielder and has several caps under his belt for the Dominican Republic.

He also holds an Italian passport.

Coaching career
In May 2021, Espinal, while still playing with them, was promoted new head coach of Eccellenza amateurs Mapello.

On 15 July 2021, he left Mapello to accept an offer from Lazio to become a member of Maurizio Sarri's coaching staff.

On 10 June 2022, after having spent a season as an assistant coach for the Lazio Under-19 team, Espinal was announced as the new head coach of Eccellenza amateurs Ospitaletto.

Honours
Serie C1:2009-2010

References

External links

ricerca.gazzetta.it

1982 births
Living people
Dominican Republic footballers
Dominican Republic international footballers
Dominican Republic expatriate footballers
Atalanta B.C. players
Taranto F.C. 1927 players
A.C. Monza players
F.C. Crotone players
F.C. Pro Vercelli 1892 players
Benevento Calcio players
Venezia F.C. players
Calcio Lecco 1912 players
Serie A players
Serie B players
Serie C players
Expatriate footballers in Italy
Sportspeople from Santo Domingo
Twin sportspeople
Dominican Republic twins
Association football midfielders